Ajitgarh  (formerly Mohali) is a district and town which is a commercial hub lying adjacent to the city of Chandigarh in Punjab, India. It was officially named after Sahibzada Ajit Singh, the eldest son of Guru Gobind Singh as SAS Nagar ("City of Sahibzada Ajit Singh").

Universities

Business schools
 Chandigarh Business School(CBS), Landran
 CMC (A TATA ENT.) Subsidiary Of Tata Consultancy Services (TCS), at Phase 10 Ajitgarh
 Indian Institute of Science Education and Research, Mohali (IISER), Knowledge City
 ISB, Sector-66, Mohali
 Indian School of Business (ISB), Sector 81

Law schools
 Army Institute of Law

Medical colleges

 C-DAC, that is engaged in research on state-of-the-art topics including Telemedicine.
 Chandigarh College of Education (CCE), Landran
 Chandigarh College of Hospitality (CCH), Landran
 Chandigarh College of Hotel Management and Catering Technology (CCHM), Landran
 Chandigarh College of Pharmacy (CCP), Landran
 Mata Sahib Kaur College of Nursing, Chandigarh-Kharar Highway, Balongi, Ajitgarh (MSKCON)

Pharmacy
 National Institute of Pharmaceutical Education and Research (NIPER)

Schools
 Yadavindra Public School, Sector 51, Mohali
 Gurukul World School, Sector-69, Mohali
 Anee's School, Sector-69, Mohali
 Gian Jyoti Public School, Phase 2, Mohali
 The British School, Sector 70. Affiliated with University of Cambridge International Examination Centre and C.B.S.E., Delhi
Doon International School, Sector-69, Mohali

References

https://www.cgc.ac.in

See also
List of schools in India
IT school in Chandigarh
Industrial Training Institute in Chandigarh

India education-related lists
List
Punjab, India-related lists